Derospidea is a genus of skeletonizing leaf beetles in the family Chrysomelidae. There are at least two described species in Derospidea. They are found in North America and Mexico.

Species
These two species belong to the genus Derospidea:
 Derospidea brevicollis (J. L. LeConte, 1865)
 Derospidea ornata (Schaeffer, 1905)

References

Further reading

External links

 

Galerucinae
Chrysomelidae genera
Articles created by Qbugbot
Taxa named by Doris Holmes Blake